The 1982–83 Phoenix Suns season was the 15th season for the Phoenix Suns of the National Basketball Association. The Suns were in the playoffs for the sixth consecutive season, extending a then-franchise record. The Suns were eliminated in the first round two games to one by the Denver Nuggets, a team they had beaten by the same margin a year earlier. The Suns were led by head coach John MacLeod and played all home games in Arizona Veterans Memorial Coliseum.

Walter Davis led the Suns in scoring with 19 points per game. Second-year player Larry Nance, who finished the season fourth in the NBA in blocks per game, was second in team scoring at 16.7, while fellow big man Maurice Lucas averaged a double-double with 16.5 points and 10.4 rebounds a contest. Lucas, a 30-year-old veteran who had played for four NBA teams and one ABA team before reaching the Suns, returned to his first All-Star Game after two seasons when he suited up with Phoenix. Point guard Dennis Johnson earned another spot on the NBA All-Defensive First Team.

Offseason

NBA Draft

Roster

Transactions

Trades

Free agents

Additions

Subtractions

References
 Standings on Basketball Reference

Phoenix Suns seasons
Phoe